Sir Rhys Mansel (c. 1487 – 1559), also Sir Rice Mansel, also Sir Rice Manxell, also Sir Rice Maunsell, Vice-Admiral, was High Sheriff of Glamorgan, a Commissioner of Peace and served as Chamberlain of Chester to King Henry VIII of England. He was High Sheriff of Glamorgan for 1542.

Sir Rice owned estates at Penrice and Oxwich, and at the Dissolution of the Monasteries he purchased Margam Abbey, which remained the property of his descendants until 1941.

He married three times.

His children with his third wife, Cecily Dabridgecourt, included:
Sir Edward Mansel (d. 1595), who  married Jane Somerset, daughter of the Earl of Worcester, and was the father of Robert Mansell sailor and glass-making entrepreneur.
 Mary Mansel, married Sir Thomas Southwell of Woodrising, Norfolk, and was the mother of Sir Robert Southwell.

References

Maunsell, Charles Albert and Statham, Edward Phillips, History of the Family of Maunsell (Mansell, Mansel) , 2 vols. in 3, Anchor Press LTD, Tiptree Essex, 1917-20.

External links
Heraldry
Oxford Dictionary of National Biography entry for Rice Mansel

1480s births
1559 deaths
16th-century Welsh military personnel
Welsh knights
High Sheriffs of Glamorgan